Teracotona wittei is a moth in the family Erebidae. It was described by Hubert Robert Debauche in 1942. It is found in the Democratic Republic of the Congo, Rwanda and Uganda.

References

Moths described in 1942
Spilosomina